María Rosa Martínez (born 29 September 1955) is an Argentine trade unionist and politician, currently serving as National Deputy elected in Buenos Aires Province. A member of Kolina, she was elected in 2019 as part of the Frente de Todos. Martínez previously worked in a number of positions in the Ministry of Social Development during the administration of Alicia Kirchner (2007–2015), and as a city councillor in Almirante Brown. She is also active in the Corriente Federal de Trabajadores (CFT).

Early life
Martínez was born on 29 September 1955 in Rojas, a minor town in Northern Buenos Aires Province. Martínez counts with a technician's degree on communication. She became politically active in the Juventud Peronista Universitaria (the student wing of the Justicialist Party) in her youth; her activism in led to her arrest during the last military dictatorship.

Political career
Martínez is politically aligned with the Corriente Federal de Trabajadores (CFT), a confederation of trade unions, and with Kolina, a kirchnerist party led by Alicia Kirchner. In 2008, she was appointed Director of Social Rights at the Ministry of Social Development, then under the leadership of Alicia Kirchner. Later, from 2010 to 2013, she was Undersecretary of Human Rights and Equal Opportunities of Almirante Brown Partido, in the administration of Daniel Bolettieri. Martínez also served as Director of Administrative Organisations and Director of Gender Policies at the Ministry of Social Development, and as an advisor to Alicia Kirchner as well.

In 2015, Martínez was elected to the City Council of Almirante Brown Partido as part of the Front for Victory.

National Deputy
Martínez ran for a seat in the Argentine Chamber of Deputies in the 2019 legislative election; she was the 18th candidate in the Frente de Todos list in Buenos Aires Province. The list received 51.64% of the vote, enough for Martínez to be elected.

As a national deputy, Martínez formed part of the parliamentary commissions on Social Action and Public Health, Cooperative Affairs and NGOs, Communications, Culture, Labour Legislation, Women and Diversity, Natural Resources, and Human Rights and Guarantees. She was a supporter of the 2020 Voluntary Interruption of Pregnancy bill, which legalized abortion in Argentina. She was also a supporter and sponsor of the Travesti-Trans labour quota law.

Electoral history

References

External links
Profile on the official website of the Chamber of Deputies (in Spanish)

Living people
1955 births
Argentine trade unionists
People from Rojas Partido
Members of the Argentine Chamber of Deputies elected in Buenos Aires Province
Women members of the Argentine Chamber of Deputies
Kolina politicians
21st-century Argentine politicians
21st-century Argentine women politicians